Čop is a Croatian and Slovene surname. Notable people with the surname include:

Bojan Čop (1923–1994), Slovenian linguist
Davor Čop (born 1958), Croatian football manager and former player
Duje Čop (born 1990), Croatian footballer
Franci Čop (1914–2003), Slovenian alpine skier
Iztok Čop (born 1972), Slovenian rower
Josip Čop (born 1954), former Croatian footballer
Matija Čop (1797–1835), Slovene linguist, literary historian and critic
Čop Street
Milan Čop (born 1938), former Croatian footballer

See also
 

Croatian surnames
Slovene-language surnames
Slavic-language surnames